Trichodezia is a genus of moths in the family Geometridae described by Warren in 1895.

Species
Listed alphabetically.
Trichodezia albofasciata (Grote, 1863)
Trichodezia albovittata (Guenée, 1857) – white-striped black
Trichodezia californiata (Packard, 1871)
Trichodezia haberhaueri (Lederer, 1864)
Trichodezia kindermanni (Bremer, 1864)

References

External links

Cidariini